Kayla River is a river in western India in Gujarat whose origin is near Sumarasar village. Its basin has a maximum length of 25 km. The total catchment area of the basin is 168 km2.

References

Rivers of Gujarat
Rivers of India